Life Belongs to Us is a 1936 documentary propaganda film commissioned and produced by the Communist Party of France. Parts of the film were taken from newsreels, and are mixed with new sketches about working people, peasants and intellectuals.

External links
 
La vie est à nous on Ciné-Archives (film archive of the French Communist Party )

1936 documentary films
1936 films
1930s French-language films
French black-and-white films
Films directed by Jacques Becker
Films directed by Jean Renoir
Films directed by André Zwoboda
French documentary films
1930s French films